Coop Trondheim og Omegn BA or Trondos is the largest consumer cooperative part of Coop NKL in Norway. The cooperative operates 50 stores and has more than 100,000 members with operation in Trondheim, Klæbu, Malvik, Melhus, Skaun and Stjørdal.

The company operates two Coop Obs!, five Coop Mega, two Coop S-Nærkjøp, one Coop Byggmix and 22 Coop Prix as well as one Domus Interiør, one Coop Obs! Sport and two YX Energi fuel stations. It also owns the shopping centres City Lade and City Syd.

History
Trondos was founded on January 1, 1970 when seven cooperatives around Trondheim merged with the name Trondheim og Omegn Samvirkelag. But the first store was founded in 1895 in Hommelvik.

Retail companies of Norway
Cooperatives in Norway
Companies based in Trondheim
Retail companies established in 1970
Coop Norden
1970 establishments in Norway